Valerianoideae is a subfamily of plants.

Genera 
 Centranthus - 12 species
 Fedia
 Nardostachys - 3 species
 Patrinia - 17 species
 Plectritis (Seablushes) - 5 species
 Valeriana (Valerians) - 125 species
 Valerianella (Cornsalads) - 20 species

References 

 Complete chloroplast genome sequence of Patrinia saniculifolia hemsl.(Disacales: Caprifoliaceae), an endemic plant in Korea. EH Jung, CE Lim, BY Lee, SP Hong - Mitochondrial DNA Part B, 2018

External links 
 
 

 
Asterid subfamilies